There have been two men named "1st Earl of Clarendon":

Edward Hyde, 1st Earl of Clarendon (1609–1674); the title became extinct in 1753.
Thomas Villiers, 1st Earl of Clarendon (1709–1786).